Trillium scouleri is a species of flowering plant in the bunchflower family Melanthiaceae.

Description
In both habit and flower structure, Trillium scouleri closely resembles Trillium ovatum. To distinguish the two species, the only reliable characters are the lengths of the filaments and anthers. In absolute terms, the filaments and anthers of T. scouleri are almost always longer than the corresponding characters in T. ovatum. The minimum, average, and maximum lengths of the filaments and anthers of each species is as follows:

The relative lengths of the filaments and anthers are also significant. In T. ovatum, the length of the filaments is equal to (or slightly less than) the length of anthers. In T. scouleri, the length of the filaments is one-half to two-thirds the length of the anthers.

Taxonomy
Trillium scouleri was described by Henry A. Gleason in 1906. For many decades the species was assumed to be a part of Trillium ovatum , but more recently T. scouleri has been shown to be a distinct species based on molecular work.

References

External links
 

scouleri
Flora of the Western United States
Plants described in 1906
Taxa named by Henry A. Gleason (botanist)